Von Delany Mizell (1910–1973) was the second black physician in Fort Lauderdale, Florida and since at that time Fort Lauderdale's hospitals would not accept "colored" patients, he helped establish Provident Hospital for black residents. He staged sit-ins and protests, boycotted Fort Lauderdale’s "Colored School", and successfully sued the Broward County Medical Association for admittance. He started the first NAACP chapter in South Florida. He was also involved in efforts to provide a beach for black residents to use and to desegregate Broward County's other beaches.

Legacy
 The site of Provident Hospital, which has been torn down, is occupied by a community center, the Von D. Mizell Community Center, owned by the city of Fort Lauderdale.
 On July 1, 2016, John U. Lloyd Beach State Park was renamed the Dr. Von D. Mizell-Eula Johnson State Park in honor of civil rights efforts undertaken by Mizell and Johnson during segregation.

Ethel Mizell Pappy Collection
Von D. Mizell's sister Ethel Mizell Pappy's personal family papers are housed at the African-American Research Library and Cultural Center  in Fort Lauderdale, FL.
Ethel Mizell Pappy family papers, African-American Research Library and Cultural Center, Broward County Library.

References

Further reading
 
 
 

Movements for civil rights
African-American physicians
Physicians from Florida
African-American history of Florida